A Woman Who Knows What She Wants is a 1934 Czech musical comedy film directed by Václav Binovec and starring Markéta Krausová, and Truda Grosslichtová. It is an adaptation of a 1932 stage musical of the same title, with music by Oscar Straus. A German-language version of the film was made at the same time with different cast and crew. The musical was adapted again as a 1958 West German film of the same title.

Cast
Markéta Krausová as Mona Cavallini, Revuestar
 as Alexander Rón, industrialist
Truda Grosslichtová as Věra, their daughter
Růžena Šlemrová as Babetta, Manon's friend
 as Secretary Anatol Veverka
Zvonimir Rogoz as Banker Klika
Vladimír Borský as Secretary Jan Rožek
Karel Třešňák as Vicepresident of Steelworks
Věra Ferbasová as Stenotypist
Josef Zezulka as Secretary of the theatre

References

External links

1934 musical comedy films
Czech musical comedy films
Czechoslovak musical comedy films
Films based on operettas
Films based on adaptations
Czechoslovak multilingual films
Czech black-and-white films
1934 multilingual films
Films directed by Václav Binovec
1930s Czech-language films
1930s Czech films